The Central Propaganda Department of the Central Committee of the Communist Party of Vietnam is an advisory body to the Central Committee, and directly subordinate to the Politburo. It is one of the most important institutions within the Vietnamese political system since its main responsibility is to defend, articulate and develop communist party theory.

Heads

modern incarnation
 Tô Huy Rứa (2007–2011)
 Đinh Thế Huynh (2011–2016)
 Võ Văn Thưởng (2016–2021)
 Colonel General Nguyễn Trọng Nghĩa (2021–present)

References

Central Committee of the Communist Party of Vietnam
1949 establishments in Vietnam
Propaganda organizations